Dexter Doria is a Filipino veteran actress. She has appeared in more than 175 films and several television programs from ABS-CBN and GMA Network.

Career
In 1977, she appeared in such movies as Elektrika Kasi, Eh!, Tisoy, Babae!, Iligpit Si Pretty Boy, and Burlesk Queen, starring Vilma Santos and Rosemarie Gil, among others.

She was nominated for Best Supporting Actress in 1978 FAMAS Award for the movie Inay. She also received the nominations for Best Supporting Actress Gawad Urian Awards in Moral (1982) and Mga Munting Tinig (2002).

Filmography

Film

Television series

Television anthologies

References

External links

Living people
Year of birth missing (living people)
20th-century Filipino actresses
Filipino film actresses
Filipino television actresses
GMA Network personalities
ABS-CBN personalities